Hussein Awada may refer to:

 Hussein Awada (footballer, born 1990), Lebanese association football forward
 Hussein Awada (footballer, born 2000), Lebanese association football midfielder